Mahmoud Ateya (born August 20, 1984) is an Egyptian professional footballer who currently plays as a goalkeeper for the Egyptian club El Raja SC.

References

1984 births
Living people
El Raja SC players
Egyptian footballers
Association football goalkeepers